Astronauts are exposed to approximately 50-2,000 millisieverts (mSv) while on six-month-duration missions to the International Space Station (ISS), the Moon and beyond. The risk of cancer caused by ionizing radiation is well documented at radiation doses beginning at 100mSv and above.

Related radiological effect studies have shown that survivors of the atomic bomb explosions in Hiroshima and Nagasaki, nuclear reactor workers and patients who have undergone therapeutic radiation treatments have received low-linear energy transfer (LET) radiation (x-rays and gamma rays) doses in the same 50-2,000 mSv range.

Composition of space radiation
While in space, astronauts are exposed to radiation which is mostly composed of high-energy protons, helium nuclei (alpha particles), and high-atomic-number ions (HZE ions), as well as secondary radiation from nuclear reactions from spacecraft parts or tissue.

The ionization patterns in molecules, cells, tissues and the resulting biological effects are distinct from typical terrestrial radiation (x-rays and gamma rays, which are low-LET radiation).  Galactic cosmic rays (GCRs) from outside the Milky Way galaxy consist mostly of highly energetic protons with a small component of HZE ions.

Prominent HZE ions:
 Carbon (C)
 Oxygen (O)
 Magnesium (Mg)
 Silicon (Si)
 Iron (Fe)
GCR energy spectra peaks (with median energy peaks up to 1,000 MeV/amu) and nuclei (energies up to 10,000 MeV/amu) are important contributors to the dose equivalent.

Uncertainties in cancer projections
One of the main roadblocks to interplanetary travel is the risk of cancer caused by radiation exposure.  The largest contributors to this roadblock are: (1) The large uncertainties associated with cancer risk estimates, (2) The unavailability of simple and effective countermeasures and (3) The inability to determine the effectiveness of countermeasures.
Operational parameters that need to be optimized to help mitigate these risks include:
 length of space missions
 crew age
 crew sex
 shielding
 biological countermeasures

Major uncertainties
 effects on biological damage related to differences between space radiation and x-rays
 dependence of risk on dose-rates in space related to the biology of DNA repair, cell regulation and tissue responses
 predicting solar particle events (SPEs)
 extrapolation from experimental data to humans and between human populations
 individual radiation sensitivity factors (genetic, epigenetic, dietary or "healthy worker" effects)

Minor uncertainties
 data on galactic cosmic ray environments
 physics of shielding assessments related to transmission properties of radiation through materials and tissue
 microgravity effects on biological responses to radiation
 errors in human data (statistical, dosimetry or recording inaccuracies)

Quantitative methods have been developed to propagate uncertainties that contribute to cancer risk estimates.  The contribution of microgravity effects on space radiation has not yet been estimated, but it is expected to be small.  The effects of changes in oxygen levels or in immune dysfunction on cancer risks are largely unknown and are of great concern during space flight.

Types of cancer caused by radiation exposure
Studies are being conducted on populations accidentally exposed to radiation (such as Chernobyl, production sites, and Hiroshima and Nagasaki). These studies show strong evidence for cancer morbidity as well as mortality risks at more than 12 tissue sites.  The largest risks for adults who have been studied include several types of leukemia, including myeloid leukemia and acute lymphatic lymphoma  as well as tumors of the lung, breast, stomach, colon, bladder and liver.  Inter-sex variations are very likely due to the differences in the natural incidence of cancer in males and females.  Another variable is the additional risk for cancer of the breast, ovaries and lungs in females.  There is also evidence of a declining risk of cancer caused by radiation with increasing age, but the magnitude of this reduction above the age of 30 is uncertain.

It is unknown whether high-LET radiation could cause the same types of tumors as low-LET radiation, but differences should be expected.

The ratio of a dose of high-LET radiation to a dose of x-rays or gamma rays that produce the same biological effect are called relative biological effectiveness (RBE) factors.  The types of tumors in humans who are exposed to space radiation will be different from those who are exposed to low-LET radiation.  This is evidenced by a study that observed mice with neutrons and have RBEs that vary with the tissue type and strain.

Measured rate of cancer among astronauts

The measured change rate of cancer is restricted by limited statistics. A study published in Scientific Reports looked over 301 U.S. astronauts and 117 Soviet and Russian cosmonauts, and found no measurable increase in cancer mortality compared to the general population, as reported by LiveScience.

An earlier 1998 study came to similar conclusions, with no statistically significant increase in cancer among astronauts compared to the reference group.

Approaches for setting acceptable risk levels
The various approaches to setting acceptable levels of radiation risk are summarized below:

 Unlimited Radiation Risk - NASA management, the families of loved ones of astronauts, and taxpayers would find this approach unacceptable.
 Comparison to Occupational Fatalities in Less-safe Industries - The life-loss from attributable radiation cancer death is less than that from most other occupational deaths.  At this time, this comparison would also be very restrictive on ISS operations because of continued improvements in ground-based occupational safety over the last 20 years.
 Comparison to Cancer Rates in General Population - The number of years of life-loss from radiation-induced cancer deaths can be significantly larger than from cancer deaths in the general population, which often occur late in life (> age 70 years) and with significantly less numbers of years of life-loss.
 Doubling Dose for 20 Years Following Exposure - Provides a roughly equivalent comparison based on life-loss from other occupational risks or background cancer fatalities during a worker's career, however, this approach negates the role of mortality effects later in life.
 Use of Ground-based Worker Limits - Provides a reference point equivalent to the standard that is set on Earth, and recognizes that astronauts face other risks.  However, ground workers remain well below dose limits, and are largely exposed to low-LET radiation where the uncertainties of biological effects are much smaller than for space radiation.

NCRP Report No. 153 provides a more recent review of cancer and other radiation risks. This report also identifies and describes the  information needed to make radiation protection recommendations beyond LEO, contains a comprehensive summary of the current body of evidence for radiation-induced health risks and also makes recommendations on areas requiring future experimentation.

Current permissible exposure limits

Career cancer risk limits
Astronauts' radiation exposure limit is not to exceed 3% of the risk of exposure-induced death (REID) from fatal cancer over their career.  It is NASA's policy to ensure a 95% confidence level (CL) that this limit is not exceeded.  These limits are applicable to all missions in low Earth orbit (LEO) as well as lunar missions that are less than 180 days in duration. In the United States, the legal occupational exposure limits for adult workers is set at an effective dose of 50 mSv annually.

Cancer risk to dose relationship
The relationship between radiation exposure and risk is both age- and sex-specific due to latency effects and differences in tissue types, sensitivities, and life spans between sexes.  These relationships are estimated using the methods that are recommended by the NCRP  and more recent radiation epidemiology information

The principle of As Low As Reasonably Achievable
The as low as reasonably achievable (ALARA) principle is a legal requirement intended to ensure astronaut safety.  An important function of ALARA is to ensure that astronauts do not approach radiation limits and that such limits are not considered as "tolerance values."  ALARA is especially important for space missions in view of the large uncertainties in cancer and other risk projection models.  Mission programs and terrestrial occupational procedures resulting in radiation exposures to astronauts are required to find cost-effective approaches to implement ALARA.

Evaluating career limits

The risk of cancer is calculated by using radiation dosimetry and physics methods.

For the purpose of determining radiation exposure limits at NASA, the probability of fatal cancer is calculated as shown below:

 The body is divided into a set of sensitive tissues, and each tissue, T, is assigned a weight, wT, according to its estimated contribution to cancer risk.
 The absorbed dose, Dγ, that is delivered to each tissue is determined from measured dosimetry.  For the purpose of estimating radiation risk to an organ, the quantity characterizing the ionization density is the LET (keV/μm).
 For a given interval of LET, between L and ΔL, the dose-equivalent risk (in units of sievert) to a tissue, T, Hγ(L) is calculated aswhere the quality factor, Q(L), is obtained according to the International Commission on Radiological Protection (ICRP).
 The average risk to a tissue, T, due to all types of radiation contributing to the dose is given by or, since , where Fγ(L) is the fluence of particles with LET=L, traversing the organ,
 The effective dose is used as a summation over radiation type and tissue using the tissue weighting factors, wγ 
 For a mission of duration t, the effective dose will be a function of time, E(t), and the effective dose for mission i will be  
 The effective dose is used to scale the mortality rate for radiation-induced death from the Japanese survivor data, applying the average of the multiplicative and additive transfer models for solid cancers and the additive transfer model for leukemia by applying life-table methodologies that are based on U.S. population data for background cancer and all causes of death mortality rates. A dose-dose rate effectiveness factor (DDREF) of 2 is assumed.

Evaluating cumulative radiation risks
The cumulative cancer fatality risk (%REID) to an astronaut for occupational radiation exposures, N, is found by applying life-table methodologies that can be approximated at small values of %REID by summing over the tissue-weighted effective dose, Ei, as

where R0 are the age- and sex- specific radiation mortality rates per unit dose.

For organ dose calculations, NASA uses the model of Billings et al. to represent the self-shielding of the human body in a water-equivalent mass approximation.  Consideration of the orientation of the human body relative to vehicle shielding should be made if it is known, especially for SPEs 

Confidence levels for career cancer risks are evaluated using methods that are specified by the NPRC in Report No. 126.  These levels were modified to account for the uncertainty in quality factors and space dosimetry.

The uncertainties that were considered in evaluating the 95% confidence levels are the uncertainties in:
 Human epidemiology data, including uncertainties in
 statistics limitations of epidemiology data
 dosimetry of exposed cohorts
 bias, including misclassification of cancer deaths, and
 the transfer of risk across populations.
 The DDREF factor that is used to scale acute radiation exposure data to low-dose and dose-rate radiation exposures.
 The radiation quality factor (Q) as a function of LET.
 Space dosimetry

The so-called "unknown uncertainties" from the NCRP report No. 126  are ignored by NASA.

Models of cancer risks and uncertainties

Life-table methodology
The double-detriment life-table approach is what is recommended by the NPRC  to measure radiation cancer mortality risks.  The age-specific mortality of a population is followed over its entire life span with competing risks from radiation and all other causes of death described.

For a homogenous population receiving an effective dose E at age aE, the probability of dying in the age-interval from a to a+1 is described by the background mortality-rate for all causes of death, M(a), and the radiation cancer mortality rate, m(E,aE,a), as:

The survival probability to age, a, following an exposure, E at age aE, is:

The excessive lifetime risk (ELR - the increased probability that an exposed individual will die from cancer) is defined by the difference in the conditional survival probabilities for the exposed and the unexposed groups as:

A minimum latency-time of 10 years is often used for low-LET radiation.  Alternative assumptions should be considered for high-LET radiation.  The REID (the lifetime risk that an individual in the population will die from cancer caused by radiation exposure) is defined by:

Generally, the value of the REID exceeds the value of the ELR by 10-20%.

The average loss of life-expectancy, LLE, in the population is defined by:

The loss of life-expectancy among exposure-induced-deaths (LLE-REID) is defined by:

Uncertainties in low-LET epidemiology data
The low-LET mortality rate per sievert, mi is written

where m0 is the baseline mortality rate per sievert and xα are quantiles (random variables) whose values are sampled from associated probability distribution functions (PDFs), P(Xa).

NCRP, in Report No. 126, defines the following subjective PDFs, P(Xa), for each factor that contributes to the acute low-LET risk projection:
 Pdosimetry is the random and systematic errors in the estimation of the doses received by atomic-bomb blast survivors.
 Pstatistical is the distribution in uncertainty in the point estimate of the risk coefficient, r0.
 Pbias is any bias resulting for over- or under-reporting cancer deaths.
 Ptransfer is the uncertainty in the transfer of cancer risk following radiation exposure from the Japanese population to the U.S. population.
 PDr is the uncertainty in the knowledge of the extrapolation of risks to low dose and dose-rates, which are embodied in the DDREF.

Risk in context of exploration mission operational scenarios
The accuracy of galactic cosmic ray environmental models, transport codes and nuclear interaction cross sections allow NASA to predict space environments and organ exposure that may be encountered on long-duration space missions.  The lack of knowledge of the biological effects of radiation exposure raise major questions about risk prediction.

The cancer risk projection for space missions is found by 

where  represents the folding of predictions of tissue-weighted LET spectra behind spacecraft shielding with the radiation mortality rate to form a rate for trial J.

Alternatively, particle-specific energy spectra, Fj(E), for each ion, j, can be used 
.

The result of either of these equations is inserted into the expression for the REID.

Related probability distribution functions (PDFs) are grouped together into a combined probability distribution function, Pcmb(x).  These PDFs are related to the risk coefficient of the normal form (dosimetry, bias and statistical uncertainties).  After a sufficient number of trials have been completed (approximately 105), the results for the REID estimated are binned and the median values and confidence intervals are found.

The chi-squared (χ2) test is used for determining whether two separate PDFs are significantly different (denoted p1(Ri) and p2(Ri), respectively).  Each p(Ri) follows a Poisson distribution with variance .

The χ2 test for n-degrees of freedom characterizing the dispersion between the two distributions is 
.

The probability, P(ņχ2), that the two distributions are the same is calculated once χ2 is determined.

Radiation carcinogenesis mortality rates
Age-and sex-dependent mortality rare per unit dose, multiplied by the radiation quality factor and reduced by the DDREF is used for projecting lifetime cancer fatality risks.  Acute gamma ray exposures are estimated.  The additivity of effects of each component in a radiation field is also assumed.

Rates are approximated using data gathered from Japanese atomic bomb survivors.  There are two different models that are considered when transferring risk from Japanese to U.S. populations.
 Multiplicative transfer model - assumes that radiation risks are proportional to spontaneous or background cancer risks.
 Additive transfer model - assumes that radiation risk acts independently of other cancer risks.

The NCRP recommends a mixture model to be used that contains fractional contributions from both methods.

The radiation mortality rate is defined as:

Where:
 ERR = excess relative risk per sievert
 EAR = excess additive risk per sievert
 Mc(a) = the sex- and age-specific cancer mortality rate in the U.S. population
 F = the tissue-weighted fluence
 L = the LET
 v = the fractional division between the assumption of the multiplicative and additive risk transfer models.  For solid cancer, it is assumed that v=1/2 and for leukemia, it is assumed that v=0.

Biological and physical countermeasures
Identifying effective countermeasures that reduce the risk of biological damage is still a long-term goal for space researchers.  These countermeasures are probably not needed for extended duration lunar missions, but will be needed for other long-duration missions to Mars and beyond. On 31 May 2013, NASA scientists reported that a possible human mission to Mars may involve a great radiation risk based on the amount of energetic particle radiation detected by the RAD on the Mars Science Laboratory while traveling from the Earth to Mars in 2011-2012.

There are three fundamental ways to reduce exposure to ionizing radiation:
 increasing the distance from the radiation source
 reducing the exposure time
 shielding (i.e.: a physical barrier)

Shielding is a plausible option, but due to current launch mass restrictions, it is prohibitively costly.  Also, the current uncertainties in risk projection prevent the actual benefit of shielding from being determined.  Strategies such as drugs and dietary supplements to reduce the effects of radiation, as well as the selection of crew members are being evaluated as viable options for reducing exposure to radiation and effects of irradiation.  Shielding is an effective protective measure for solar particle events.  As far as shielding from GCR, high-energy radiation is very penetrating and the effectiveness of radiation shielding depends on the atomic make-up of the material used.

Antioxidants are effectively used to prevent the damage caused by radiation injury and oxygen poisoning (the formation of reactive oxygen species), but since antioxidants work by rescuing cells from a particular form of cell death (apoptosis), they may not protect against damaged cells that can initiate tumor growth.

Evidence sub-pages
The evidence and updates to projection models for cancer risk from low-LET radiation are reviewed periodically by several bodies, which include the following organizations:
 The NAS Committee on the Biological Effects of Ionizing Radiation
 The United Nations Scientific Committee on the Effects of Atomic Radiation (UNSCEAR)
 The ICRP
 The NCRP

These committees release new reports about every 10 years on cancer risks that are applicable to low-LET radiation exposures.  Overall, the estimates of cancer risks among the different reports of these panels will agree within a factor of two or less.  There is continued controversy for doses that are below 5 mSv, however, and for low dose-rate radiation because of debate over the linear no-threshold hypothesis that is often used in statistical analysis of these data.  The BEIR VII report, which is the most recent of the major reports is used in the following sub-pages.  Evidence for low-LET cancer effects must be augmented by information on protons, neutrons, and HZE nuclei that is only available in experimental models.  Such data have been reviewed by NASA several times in the past and by the NCRP.
 Epidemiology data for low linear energy transfer radiation
 Radiobiology evidence for protons and HZE nuclei

See also

 Central nervous system effects from radiation exposure during spaceflight
 Dosimetry
 Health threat from cosmic rays
 Radiation Syndrome
 Radiation protection

References

External links
 
 
 
 
 
 The Health Risks of Extraterrestrial Environments

Space medicine